Kevin Manfredi (born 3 January 1995) is an Italian Grand Prix motorcycle racer, competing in the MotoE World Cup for the Octo Pramac MotoE.In 2022 FIM Endurance World Championship he rides for Polish based Wojcik Racing Team in superstock category.

Career statistics

Career records

By season

Grand Prix motorcycle racing

By season

By class

Races by year
(key) (Races in bold indicate pole position; races in italics indicate fastest lap)

 Half points awarded as less than two thirds of the race distance (but at least three full laps) was completed.

References

1995 births
Living people
People from Sarzana
Italian motorcycle racers
MotoE World Cup riders
Sportspeople from the Province of La Spezia